Secret Love  ( Taknvatz Ser) was an Armenian romantic melodrama television series based on the popular Tierra de reyes Spanish-language telenovela. The series premiered on Shant TV on April 25, 2016, and is composed of 95 episodes.
Most of the series took place in Yerevan, Armenia.

Series overview

Cast and characters

Main Cast
Ashot Ter-Matevosyan portrays David Karapetyan
Gayane Balyan portrays Anna Danielyan
Gnel Ulikhanyan portrays Sos Karapetyan
Mariam Adamyan portrays Saten Danielyan
David Aghajanyan portrays Levon Karapetyan
Sofya Poghosyan portrays Mane Danielyan
Murad Nadiryan portrays Vahe Khachatryan
Nelli Kheranyan portrays Elena Danielyan
Davit Hakobyan portrays Arshak
Inna Khojamiryan portrays Liza Karapetyan / Ani
Milena Vardanyan portrays Nika
Lusine Hovakimyan portrays Manan
Tatev Mirzoyan portrays Syuzan
Suren Tumasyan portrays Atom Badalyan
Olya Hakobyan portrays Karine Margaryan
Samvel Asatryan portrays Artak Margaryan

Recurring Cast
Armen Margaryan portrays Hrant Danielyan
Ashot Hkaobyan portrays Voskanyan
Asya Hovsepyan portrays Liusi
Liza Barseghyan portrays Maro
Hayk Hovhannisyan portrays Feliks
Karen Galstyan portrays Gor Karakhanyan
unknown portrays Sako
unknown portrays Armen
Arm Grigoryan portrays Sevak
Hrach Mlrakyan portrays Aram
Nane Gasparyan portrays Ruzan

References

External links
 
 
 Secret Love on Armserial
 Secret Love on ArmFilm
 Secret Love on Hayojax

Armenian-language television shows
Armenian drama television series
Shant TV original programming
2016 Armenian television series debuts
2010s Armenian television series